Molinas is a Spanish surname meaning "mills". Notable people with this name include:
Jack Molinas (1931–1975), American basketball player
 (1888–1973), Argentine politician
Marta Molinas (born 1968), Paraguayan and Norwegian electrical engineer
Nicanor Molinas (1823–1892), Argentine lawyer
Osmar Molinas (born 1987), Paraguayan footballer

See also
Molina (surname)